Eric Edward Fullerton (born May 7, 1962) from the University of California, San Diego, was named Fellow of the Institute of Electrical and Electronics Engineers (IEEE) in 2012 "for contributions to the synthesis and characterization of magnetic exchange coupled films, superlattices and recording media".

In 2018, Fullerton was elected a member of the National Academy of Engineering for the invention and development of multilayer high-density magnetic recording media.

References 

Fellow Members of the IEEE
Living people
University of California, San Diego faculty
University of California, San Diego alumni
Engineers from California
1962 births
Fellows of the American Physical Society
American electrical engineers